Elegia capensis, called the horsetail restio, is a species of grasslike flowering plant in the genus Elegia, native to the Cape Provinces of South Africa. It has gained the Royal Horticultural Society's Award of Garden Merit.

References

capensis
Endemic flora of South Africa
Plants described in 1967
Taxa named by Nicolaas Laurens Burman